Llantarnam School was a state-funded and non-selective comprehensive school in the Llantarnam suburb of Cwmbran, Torfaen in Wales. Construction began in 1950 and was the first of three secondary modern schools to be built in Cwmbran New Town. It became a comprehensive in 1971 with extensions such as the sixth form building, sports hall and leisure center built by 1975. As part of Torfaen County's 21st century programme, Llantarnam closed in 2015 and was merged with Fairwater High on the latter site to form the larger Cwmbran High School. Llantarnam itself provided education for approximately 1,400 students between the ages of 11 and 19. The school had been placed on special measures, after the publication of an unsatisfactory Estyn inspection report in November 2012. The school site is now a new housing development called St. Michael's Gate, with the playing fields now part of the new Llantarnam Primary School, having replaced the original in Oakfield which was demolished in 2017. That too is now a new housing development called Oakfield Grange.

Site layout
The school was split into three main buildings (one of which was split) with two smaller buildings on site. The main buildings were named Ebbw, Llwyd, Usk and Monnow after the local Ebbw River, Afon Llwyd, River Usk and River Monnow. These were also the names of the four houses in the school. The two smaller buildings were referred to as the Design Technology Block and the Science Block.

Each of the three main buildings had three storeys or levels and a main access corridor on the first level which were referred to by students and faculty as Llwyd Corridor, Usk Corridor and Monnow Corridor. The school's canteen was located in Llwyd Building but there had been a second canteen in Usk Building until 2006. What was Usk Canteen became the Sixth Form study area. (see below)

Both the science block and the design technology block housed other subjects as well as their own. The science block contained three classrooms and one science prep room which linked the two science classrooms. The third classroom was used as a physical education theory classroom and had a set of computers connected to the schools network. The design technology block contained two workshops, three design technology classrooms and an art classroom.  These classrooms all had smaller rooms used for storage.

Usk Building contained two geography rooms on the top floor, a staff room, three drama classrooms, three religious studies classrooms, the headteacher's office as well as the other main school administrative offices.  The ground floor contained student's toilets and staff toilets, a classroom and a sixth form area which contained a locker room (now Offices), and it contained Sixth Form toilets, a common room, one classroom which was also used as a Sixth Form study area.

References

External links
Llantarnam School's Official Website

Secondary schools in Torfaen
Cwmbran
1954 establishments in Wales